Youngstown was a boy band formed December 31, 1998. The band, made up of David "DC" Yeager, Samuel "Sammy" Lopez Jr and James L. Dallas, is named for the trio's hometown, Youngstown, Ohio.

History
The band's first single, "I'll Be Your Everything", featured on the film soundtrack for Inspector Gadget and on their debut album Let's Roll. In February 2000, Disney Channel aired Steps and Youngstown In Concert, a concert special featuring Youngstown and another group, Steps. 

Their second album, Down For the Get Down, was released in 2001, and yielded the #21 Hot Singles Sales US hit "Sugar". Both albums were released through Hollywood Records. "Could You Love Me", the second album track was recorded later by Nick Lachey on his first album, SoulO. Another of their songs, "Away With The Summer Days", is on the first Princess Diaries soundtrack. 

By 2005, the band dissolved.

Members
 David "DC" Yeager
 James Lee "Dallas"
 Samuel "Sammy" Lopez Jr

Discography

Albums
 Let's Roll (September 28, 1999)
 Down for the Get Down (August 7, 2001)

Other albums
 Pokémon World Collector's Edition, (with Nobody's Angel), Released: February 8, 2000. Music for Pokémon: The Movie 2000.

Singles
1999: "I'll Be Your Everything"
1999: "It's Not What You Think" (from soundtrack for The Famous Jett Jackson)
2000: "Pedal to the Steel" (featuring Kel Mitchell), Released: November 21, 2000 (import)
2000: "The Prince You Charmed"
2001: "Sugar" (enhanced single) 
2001: "Anything and Everything", Released on Summer Catch soundtrack

References

External links
 Youngstown discography in Discogs.com
 Youngstown at Soundclick.com
 
 
 

American pop music groups
American boy bands
American musical trios
Musical groups from Ohio
Musicians from Youngstown, Ohio
Musical groups established in 1999
Musical groups disestablished in 2005
1999 establishments in Ohio